Duvernay  is a hamlet in central Alberta, Canada within the County of Two Hills No. 21. The hamlet of Brosseau is located immediately across the river along the north bank.

The hamlet has the name of Ludger Duvernay. The Duvernay Formation, a stratigraphical unit of the Western Canadian Sedimentary Basin was named for the hamlet.

Demographics 
Duvernay recorded a population of 26 in the 1991 Census of Population conducted by Statistics Canada.

See also 
List of communities in Alberta
List of hamlets in Alberta

References 

Hamlets in Alberta
County of Two Hills No. 21
Populated places on the North Saskatchewan River